Alkalicoccus saliphilus is a Gram-positive and haloalkaliphilic bacterium from the genus of Alkalicoccus.

References

Bacillaceae
Bacteria described in 2005